Crescent Heights may refer to:

Crescent Heights, Calgary, Alberta, Canada
Crescent Heights High School (Calgary, Alberta)
Crescent Heights, New Jersey, United States
Crescent Heights, Texas
Crescent Heights High School (Medicine Hat) in Medicine Hat, Alberta, Canada
Crescent Heights (company), American real estate developer